Stictane fractilinea is a moth in the family Erebidae. It was described by Snellen in 1880. It is found on Sumatra and possibly in India (Sikkim), Sri Lanka and on Java.

References

Moths described in 1880
Nudariina